The  is the prefectural flag of Iwate Prefecture, Japan. This article also discusses the Iwate prefectural emblem which is displayed on the flag.

Overview 
To commemorate the construction of the Iwate Prefectural Office, a public contest was held to create a new symbol for Iwate, and the crest was announced on 10 November 1964 under . The symbol itself is a vertically symmetrical adaptation of the Chinese character 岩, pronounced iwa, as in Iwate.

The flag itself was instituted on 6 March 1965. It consists of a grayish blue background with the Iwate crest centered in white.

See also 
Great Sasuke - Japanese pro wrestler and former Iwate Prefectural Assembly legislator. While he was a legislator, he wore a mask based on the Iwate prefectural crest.

References

External links 
 Iwate Prefectural Symbols page 

Iwate
Iwate Prefecture
Iwate Prefecture
Iwate
1965 establishments in Japan